Aquilegia skinneri, commonly known as the Mexican columbine or Skinner's columbine, is a species of flowering plant in the buttercup family.

Taxonomy 

Aquilegia skinneri was first described in 1842 by William Jackson Hooker in Curtis's Botanical Magazine, based on plants grown from seeds reported to have been collected in Guatemala by George Ure Skinner. The same year Hooker described another species, Aquilega mexicana, although this is now considered to be the same species as Aquilegia skinneri. In 1909, Joseph Nelson Rose described a new species, Aquilegia madrensis, based on samples collected in the Sierra Madre in Mexico, which were described as having similar morphology to Aquilegia skinneri. Aquilegia madrensis is now considered the same species as Aqulegia skinneri. Rose in part considered the samples he collected to belong to a different species because Hooker had reported that Aquilegia skinneri was a Guatemala species. However, it suggested that the labels were mixed up in England, and that Skinner's samples were actually collected in Chihuahua in northern Mexico rather than Guatemala. 

Both the specific epithet "skinneri", and the common name "Skinner's columbine", are named after Skinner.

Distribution 
Aquilegia skinneri is native to Mexico and Guatemala.

Uses 
Aquilegia skinneri is cultivated as a garden ornamental.

References 

skinneri